Michael John Hill (born 1 July 1951) is an English retired first-class cricketer. He was a right-handed batsman who played as a wicketkeeper.

Early life and education
Hill was educated at Abingdon School where he was coached by ex-England cricketer Gerald Smithson. He initially played for the junior fifteen rugby side and rugby sevens team in 1965 and 1966  before winning the Single Wicket Cricket Competition Cup in the summer of 1965. He was selected to play for the Southern Counties cricket team as wicketkeeper, in 1969 and 1970 and was the School's first XI captain in 1970.

Career
Hill played his entire first-class career for Hampshire, making his first-class debut in 1973 against the touring West Indians. Hill's next first-class match would not come until 1975, when he played against the touring Australians. The same year Hill made his one-day debut for Hampshire against Surrey County Cricket Club.

Hill played four first-class matches during the 1976 County Championship season, with Hill's final first-class match coming against Kent in May 1976. His final one-day match came against Somerset in the same month. Hill left Hampshire midway through the 1976 season.

See also
 List of Old Abingdonians

References

External links 
Michael Hill at Cricinfo
Michael Hill at CricketArchive

1951 births
Living people
People from Vale of White Horse (district)
English cricketers
Hampshire cricketers
People educated at Abingdon School